Trick or Treat is a British television show hosted by Derren Brown produced by Objective Productions and broadcast on Channel 4. The first episode was broadcast on 13 April 2007.  The focus of the show is on one person selected from a pool of volunteers who responded to adverts in the national press to take part in the show. The experience the volunteer receives is decided by which card they choose. If they choose the card that says 'Trick' they receive a bad experience and if they choose the card that says 'Treat' they receive a good experience. This distinction is not always obvious, however: in Series 2, a participant's dark experience of being persuaded to (supposedly) kill a kitten was a 'treat' because of the positive attitude to life Derren believed she would consequently develop; similarly, a volunteer who chose a 'trick' was kidnapped, but had been taught escapology techniques which enabled her to easily escape.

Episodes of Trick or Treat are not preceded by Brown's usual claim that no actors or stooges were used in the filming of the shows. Indeed, some participants (such as the ambulance crew in the final episode of Series 1) are declared to be actors.

Episode list

Series 1
Series 1 of Trick or Treat began airing on 17 April 2007.

The cards that Brown used throughout this series of this show are deceptive as they are rotational ambigrams and can read either 'Trick' or 'Treat' depending on which way up Brown chooses to hold them, and thus the card chosen by the participant is irrelevant, in terms of the following events. The ambigram was designed by John Langdon.  To break up the stories of each episode, the series also includes separate routines with celebrities and also footage from the USA where Brown has been able to use his anonymity to try out new stunts.

Series 2
Series 2 of Trick or Treat began airing on 2 May 2008.

The cards which Brown used in this series are not the ambigrams as used in Series 1, but are visually distinct 'Trick' and 'Treat' cards.

References

External links
 

2007 British television series debuts
2008 British television series endings
Channel 4 original programming
Derren Brown
British television magic series
Television series by All3Media
English-language television shows